Triazane is an inorganic compound with the chemical formula  or . Triazane is the third simplest acyclic azane after ammonia and hydrazine. It can be synthesized from hydrazine but is unstable and cannot be isolated in the free base form, only as salt forms such as triazanium sulfate. Attempts to convert triazanium salts to the free base release only diazene and ammonia. Triazane was first synthesized as a ligand of the silver complex ion: tris(μ2-triazane-κ2N1,N3)disilver(2+). Triazane has also been synthesized in electron-irradiated ammonia ices and detected as a stable gas-phase product after sublimation.

Compounds containing the triazane skeleton
Several compounds containing the triazane skeleton are known, including 1-methyl-1-nitrosohydrazine, produced from the solventless reaction of methylhydrazine and an alkyl nitrite (R–O–N=O):

1-Methyl-1-nitrosohydrazine is a colorless solid, sensitive to impact, but not to friction. It melts at 45°C and decomposes at 121°C.

References

External links
1-methyl-1-nitrosohydrazine, shows structure of 1-methyl-1-nitrosohydrazine

Nitrogen hydrides